Liam Watson (born 1983) is a former hurler who played for Loughgiel Shamrocks GAC. He was nominated for an All Star award in 2011 and travelled to the United States as a replacement.

Watson made his first appearance for Antrim during the 2002 championship and immediately became a regular member of the starting fifteen. He won eleven Ulster medals, one National League (Division 2) medal and one Christy Ring Cup medal, the latter as a non-playing substitute.

At club level, Watson is an All-Ireland medalist with Loughgiel Shamrocks. He has also won four Ulster medals and four county club championship medals. In March 2012 he scored 3–7 when he won the All-Ireland Senior Club Hurling Championship with Loughgiel after a 4–13 0–17 defeat of Coolderry in the final at Croke Park.

Career statistics

Club

Honours
 Antrim Senior Hurling Championship (11) 2002, 2003, 2004, 2005, 2006, 2007, 2008, 2009, 2010, 2011, 2012
 National Hurling League Division 2 (1) 2003
 Christy Ring Cup (1) 2006
 Walsh Cup (1) 2008
 Ulster Under-21 Hurling Championship (2) 2001 2002
 Ulster Minor Hurling Championship (2)
 Antrim Senior Hurling Championship (4) 2010 2011 2012 2013
 Ulster Senior Club Hurling Championship (4) 2010 2011 2012 2013
 All-Ireland Senior Club Hurling Championship (1) 2012
 Lory Meagher Cup (1) 2017

References

1983 births
Living people
Loughgiel Shamrocks hurlers
Antrim inter-county hurlers
Ulster inter-provincial hurlers